It Was She Who Wanted It! (Italian: Era lei che lo voleva!) is a 1953 Italian comedy film directed by Marino Girolami and starring Walter Chiari, Lucia Bosè and Carlo Campanini. The film's sets were designed by the art director Alberto Boccianti. It involves the emotional bickering between a psychiatrist and a rather brusque boxer.

Plot
After seeing the famous Dinamite boxer in a sports magazine, a girl has visions, seeing in every person she meets the face of the boxer. Her doctor manages to remind her of having met him in a fleeting and unpleasant occasion, but concludes that the visions are the result of her unconscious love for the boxer.

Cast
 Walter Chiari as Walter Martini 
 Lucia Bosé as Nausicaa 
 Carlo Campanini as Antonio 
 Jone Morino as Donna Eva 
 Giuseppe Porelli as Comm. Invernaghi 
 Carmen de Lirio as 	Carmen 
 Mario Ruspoli as The Cousin Raoul
 Belle Tildy as The Maid at Invernaghi's
 Giovanni D'Anzi as 	Kid Tartufi
 Rolf Tasna as Dr Rossi 
 Enzo Fiermonte as a Puglie 
 Ettore Bevilacqua as 	Galba
 Aldo Spoldi as Franco
 Tiberio Mitri as The Boxer Raoul
 Egisto Peire as Self 
 Leone Jacovacci as The Punch-Drunk Boxer
 Carlo Orlandi as 	Boxer Guest at the Wedding Breakfast

References

Bibliography
 Chiti, Roberto & Poppi, Roberto & Lancia, Enrico. Dizionario del cinema italiano: Dal 1945 al 1959. Gremese Editore, 1991.
 Hennessey, Brendan. Luchino Visconti and the Alchemy of Adaptation. State University of New York Press,  2021.

External links
 

1953 films
Italian comedy films
1950s Italian-language films
Films directed by Marino Girolami
1953 comedy films
1950s Italian films